Ikuchi is a yōkai of the sea serpent type in Japanese legend. 

Tankai
It has only been spotted at night, sometimes rearing out of water and slinking over a ship, taking a long time to complete its passage, and leaving a residue of viscous oil. The sheer amount of oil needs to be dumped overboard lest the ship may sink.

It does not have much thickness supposedly, but spans a total length of several hundred jō（several thousand feet), requiring 1 or 2  (1+ or 2+ hours, perhaps little less than 3 hours) to finish hauling its whole length across the ship. Its body oil is said to have the consistency of funori (gummy substance derived from Gloiopeltis seaweed) and slickens the ship's deck so walking back and forth becomes impossible. Thus the ship needs be scrubbed and cleansed thoroughly after a visit by the ikuchi.

Mimibukuro

This ikuji  was said to appear in the western and southern seas of Japan, and it would get snagged on the bow of the ship. It had the colors similar to an eel, and was immeasurably long, perhaps several jō in length, and it would keep squirming on the bow for the length of 2, 3 days.

The phrase "ikuji naki" ("lacking courage") purportedly derives from this creature's name. 

The author, Negishi, states that he heard from a certain informant that in the island of Hachijō-jima in Izu Province (the island is now incorporated into Tokyo Prefecture), there can be found small-sized ikuji which look like eels but have no eyes or mouth and form circular loops. Negishi thus conjectures that the (full grown) ikuji reported to dangle itself from the ship's bow, must actually be hanging like a ring on the bow and revolving around.

Sekien's ayakashi 

The drawing of "ayakashi" in Toriyama Sekien's Konjaku Hyakki Shūi depicts an enormously long sea creature, said to appear in the seas of Western Japan, "slithering" over a ship for two or three days, depositing loads of oil, forcing the crew to "furiously bail" it out, for fear it would cause their ship to sink.

The description of Sekien's ayakashi is closely similar to the ikuchi, and Japanese commentators have equate them, noting that ayakashi is merely a generic term for all sorts of strange phenomena (and monsters) of the sea.

Analyses 
The ikuchi has depicted by Sekien's like a sea serpent and some sources categorize ikuchi as belonging to a class of sea serpents, or creature of uncertain identity, i.e., cryptids. It has been conjectured it might be unknown giant species of sea snakes.

English translators of Sekien regard the "long thing" appearing out of the sea, not as the entire body of the sea-serpent like creature, but as a single strand of long "tendril" (tentacle) of the monster, suggesting this may be an imported lore of the kraken, a legendary giant cephalopod creature.

Am additional piece of lore associated with the ayakashi is that they are formed by the souls or ghosts of humans who have drowned and want others to join them.

Explanatory notes

References

Japanese literature
Yōkai
Legendary fish
Sea serpents